1986 Soviet Second League was a Soviet competition in the Soviet Second League.

Zonal tournament

Zone I [Russian Federation]

Zone II [Russian Federation]

Match for 1st place [Oct 19, Novorossiysk] 
 Krylya Sovetov Kuibyshev  0-0 Zenit Izhevsk  [pen 5-4]

Zone III [Russian Federation]

Zone IV [Russian Federation]

Zone V (Soviet Republics)

Zone VI [Ukraine]

 For places 1-14

Zone VII (Central Asia)

Zone VIII [Kazakhstan]

Zone IX (Caucasus)

Zone Finals

Group 1

Group 2

Group 3

References
 All-Soviet Archive Site
 Results. RSSSF

Soviet Second League seasons
3
Soviet
Soviet